Circumcision is a procedure that removes the foreskin from the human penis. In the most common form of the operation, the foreskin is extended with forceps, then a circumcision device may be placed, after which the foreskin is excised. Topical or locally injected anesthesia is generally used to reduce pain and physiologic stress. Circumcision is generally electively performed, most commonly done as a form of preventive healthcare, as a religious obligation, or as a cultural practice. It is also an option for cases of phimosis, other pathologies that do not resolve with other treatments, and chronic urinary tract infections (UTIs). The procedure is contraindicated in cases of certain genital structure abnormalities or poor general health.

Circumcision is associated with reduced rates of sexually transmitted infections and urinary tract infections. This includes decreasing the incidence of cancer-causing forms of human papillomavirus (HPV) and significantly reducing HIV transmission among heterosexual men within high risk populations. The World Health Organization (WHO) and UNAIDS recommend circumcision as part of a comprehensive HIV transmission program in areas with high endemic rates of HIV. The WHO does not recommend circumcision for HIV prevention in men who have sex with men; effectiveness of using circumcision to prevent HIV in the developed world is unclear. Neonatal circumcision also decreases the risk of penile cancer. Complication rates are higher when the procedure is performed on older people. A 2010 review found circumcisions performed by medical providers to have a typical complication rate of 1.5% for babies and 6% for older children, with few cases of severe complications. Bleeding, infection, and the removal of either too much or too little foreskin are the most common acute complications. Meatal stenosis is the most common long term complication. Major medical organizations hold variant perspectives on the prophylactic efficacy of the elective circumcision of minors. The WHO, UNAIDS, and American medical organizations take the position that it carries prophylactic health benefits which outweigh small risks, while European medical organizations generally hold the belief that in these situations its medical benefits are not counterbalanced by risk.  

Prophylactic circumcision originated in England during the 1850s, becoming established as a way to prevent sexually transmitted infections. Beyond use as a prophylactic or treatment option in healthcare, circumcision plays a major role in many of the world's cultures and religions, most prominently Judaism and Islam. Circumcision is among the most important commandments in Judaism. Historically, campaigns of Jewish persecution have included bans on the practice as a means of forceful assimilation, conversion, and ethnocide. Variant medical, cultural, religious, and ethical views have led to a widely diverging incidence and prevalence within polities. It is widespread in Australia, Canada, the United States, South Korea, New Zealand, most of Africa, and parts of Asia. It is relatively rare for non-religious reasons in parts of Southern Africa, Latin America, Europe, and parts of Asia. The origin of circumcision is not known with certainty; the oldest documentation comes from ancient Egypt.

Uses

Elective 
Around half of all circumcisions worldwide are performed for reasons of prophylactic healthcare.

Prophylactic usage in high-risk populations 

There is a consensus among the world's major medical organizations and in the academic literature that circumcision is an efficacious intervention for HIV prevention in high risk populations if carried out by medical professionals under safe conditions. 

In 2007, the WHO and the Joint United Nations Programme on HIV/AIDS (UNAIDS) stated that they recommended adolescent and adult circumcision as part of a comprehensive program for prevention of HIV transmission in areas with high endemic rates of HIV, as long as the program includes "informed consent, confidentiality, and absence of coercion" ― known as voluntary medical male circumcision, or VMMC. In 2010, this was expanded to routine neonatal circumcision, as long as those undergoing the procedure received assent from their parents. In 2020, the World Health Organization again concluded that male circumcision is an efficacious intervention for HIV prevention and that the promotion of male circumcision is an essential strategy, in addition to other preventive measures, for the prevention of heterosexually acquired HIV infection in men. Eastern and southern Africa had a particularly low prevalence of circumcised males. This region has a disproportionately high HIV infection rate, with a significant number of those infections stemming from heterosexual transmission. As a result, the promotion of prophylactic circumcision has been a priority intervention in that region since the WHO's 2007 recommendations.

The International Antiviral Society–USA also suggests circumcision be discussed with men who have insertive anal sex with men, especially in regions where HIV is common. There is evidence that circumcision is associated with a reduced risk of HIV infection for such men, particularly in low-income countries.

The finding that circumcision significantly reduces female-to-male HIV transmission has prompted medical organizations serving communities affected by endemic HIV/AIDS to promote circumcision as an additional method of controlling the spread of HIV.

Prophylactic usage in developed countries 
Major medical organizations hold varying positions on the prophylactic efficacy of the elective circumcision of minors in the context of developed countries. Literature on the matter is polarized, with the cost-benefit analysis being highly dependent on the kinds and frequencies of health problems in the population under discussion and how circumcision affects them.

The World Health Organization (WHO), UNAIDS, and American medical organizations take the position that it carries prophylactic health benefits which outweigh small risks, while European medical organizations generally hold the belief that in these situations its medical benefits are not counterbalanced by risk. Public health advocates of circumcision consider it to have a net health benefit, and therefore feel that increasing the circumcision rate is imperative. They recommend performing it during the neonatal period when it is less expensive and has a lower risk of complications. The American Academy of Pediatrics and Centers for Disease Control and Prevention stated that the benefits of circumcision outweigh the risks.

Similarly, the World Health Organization in 2010 stated:

Religious, cultural, and ethnic circumcision 

Worldwide, around half of all circumcisions are performed for religious or cultural reasons. Circumcision plays a major role in many of the world's cultures and religions. When performed for religious reasons, it is most common among Muslims and Jews, among whom it is near-universal. Circumcision is an integral or established practice for members of these faiths, as well as among the Samaritans and Druze.

In some African and Eastern Christian denominations male circumcision is an established practice, and require that their male members undergo circumcision.  It is commonly performed among members of the Coptic, Ethiopian, and Eritrean Orthodox Churches.

Pathologies 
Circumcision is also used to treat various pathologies. These include pathological phimosis, refractory balanoposthitis and chronic or recurrent urinary tract infections (UTIs).

Contraindications 
Circumcision is contraindicated in certain cases. These include infants with certain genital structure abnormalities, such as a misplaced urethral opening (as in hypospadias and epispadias), curvature of the head of the penis (chordee), or ambiguous genitalia, because the foreskin may be needed for reconstructive surgery. Circumcision is contraindicated in premature infants and those who are not clinically stable and in good health. If an individual is known to have or has a family history of serious bleeding disorders such as hemophilia, it is recommended that the blood be checked for normal coagulation properties before the procedure is attempted.

Technique

The foreskin is the double-layered fold of tissue at the distal end of the human penis that covers the glans and the urinary meatus. For adult medical circumcision, superficial wound healing takes up to a week, and complete healing 4 to 6 months. For infants, healing is usually complete within one week.

Removal of the foreskin
For infant circumcision, devices such as the Gomco clamp, Plastibell and Mogen clamp are commonly used in the USA.  These follow the same basic procedure. First, the amount of foreskin to be removed is estimated. The practitioner opens the foreskin via the preputial orifice to reveal the glans underneath and ensures it is normal before bluntly separating the inner lining of the foreskin (preputial epithelium) from its attachment to the glans. The practitioner then places the circumcision device (this sometimes requires a dorsal slit), which remains until blood flow has stopped. Finally, the foreskin is amputated. For older babies and adults, circumcision is often performed surgically without specialized instruments, and alternatives such as Unicirc or the Shang ring are available.

Pain management
The circumcision procedure causes pain, and for neonates this pain may interfere with mother-infant interaction or cause other behavioral changes, so the use of analgesia is advocated. Ordinary procedural pain may be managed in pharmacological and non-pharmacological ways. Pharmacological methods, such as localized or regional pain-blocking injections and topical analgesic creams, are safe and effective. The ring block and dorsal penile nerve block (DPNB) are the most effective at reducing pain, and the ring block may be more effective than the DPNB. They are more effective than EMLA (eutectic mixture of local anesthetics) cream, which is more effective than a placebo. Topical creams have been found to irritate the skin of low birth weight infants, so penile nerve block techniques are recommended in this group.

For infants, non-pharmacological methods such as the use of a comfortable, padded chair and a sucrose or non-sucrose pacifier are more effective at reducing pain than a placebo, but the American Academy of Pediatrics (AAP) states that such methods are insufficient alone and should be used to supplement more effective techniques. A quicker procedure reduces duration of pain; use of the Mogen clamp was found to result in a shorter procedure time and less pain-induced stress than the use of the Gomco clamp or the Plastibell. The available evidence does not indicate that post-procedure pain management is needed.  For adults, topical anesthesia, ring block, dorsal penile nerve block (DPNB) and general anesthesia are all options, and the procedure requires four to six weeks of abstinence from masturbation or intercourse to allow the wound to heal.

Effects

Sexually transmitted diseases

Human immunodeficiency virus
 

There is strong evidence that circumcision reduces the risk of men acquiring HIV infection in areas of the world with high rates of HIV. This evidence is principally derived from three randomized controlled studies conducted in Africa in 2002. Evidence among heterosexual men in sub-Saharan Africa shows an absolute decrease in risk of 1.8% which is a relative decrease of between 38% and 66% over two years, and in this population studies rate it cost-effective. Whether it is of benefit in developed countries is undetermined.

There are plausible explanations based on human biology for how circumcision can decrease the likelihood of female-to-male HIV transmission. The superficial skin layers of the penis contain Langerhans cells, which are targeted by HIV; removing the foreskin reduces the number of these cells.  When an uncircumcised penis is erect during intercourse, any small tears on the inner surface of the foreskin come into direct contact with the vaginal walls, providing a pathway for transmission. When an uncircumcised penis is flaccid, the pocket between the inside of the foreskin and the head of the penis provides an environment conducive to pathogen survival; circumcision eliminates this pocket. Some experimental evidence has been provided to support these theories.

The WHO and the UNAIDS state that male circumcision is an efficacious intervention for HIV prevention, but should be carried out by well-trained medical professionals and under conditions of informed consent (parents' consent for their infant boys).  The WHO has judged circumcision to be a cost-effective public health intervention against the spread of HIV in Africa, although not necessarily more cost-effective than condoms. The joint WHO/UNAIDS recommendation also notes that circumcision only provides partial protection from HIV and should not replace known methods of HIV prevention.

Male circumcision provides only indirect HIV protection for heterosexual women. The WHO does not recommend circumcision as a protection for male-to-male HIV transmission. Evidence is lacking with regards to circumcision reducing HIV risk for receptive anal intercourse.

Human papillomavirus
Human papillomavirus (HPV) is the most commonly transmitted sexually transmitted infection, affecting both men and women. While most infections are asymptomatic and are cleared by the immune system, some types of the virus cause genital warts, and other types, if untreated, cause various forms of cancer, including cervical cancer, and penile cancer. Genital warts and cervical cancer are the two most common problems resulting from HPV.

Circumcision is associated with a reduced prevalence of oncogenic types of HPV infection, meaning that a randomly selected circumcised man is less likely to be found infected with cancer-causing types of HPV than an uncircumcised man. It also decreases the likelihood of multiple infections.  there was no strong evidence that it reduces the rate of new HPV infection, but the procedure is associated with increased clearance of the virus by the body, which can account for the finding of reduced prevalence.

Although genital warts are caused by a type of HPV, there is no statistically significant relationship between being circumcised and the presence of genital warts.

Other infections
Studies evaluating the effect of circumcision on the rates of other sexually transmitted infections have generally, found it to be protective. A 2006 meta-analysis found that circumcision was associated with lower rates of syphilis, chancroid and possibly genital herpes. A 2010 review found that circumcision reduced the incidence of HSV-2 (herpes simplex virus, type 2) infections by 28%. The researchers found mixed results for protection against trichomonas vaginalis and chlamydia trachomatis, and no evidence of protection against gonorrhea or syphilis. It may also possibly protect against syphilis in MSM.

Phimosis, balanitis and balanoposthitis
Phimosis is the inability to retract the foreskin over the glans penis. At birth, the foreskin cannot be retracted due to adhesions between the foreskin and glans, and this is considered normal (physiological phimosis). Over time the foreskin naturally separates from the glans, and a majority of boys are able to retract the foreskin by age three. Less than one percent are still having problems at age 18. If the inability to do so becomes problematic (pathological phimosis) circumcision is a treatment option. This pathological phimosis may be due to scarring from the skin disease balanitis xerotica obliterans (BXO), repeated episodes of balanoposthitis or forced retraction of the foreskin. Steroid creams are also a reasonable option and may prevent the need for surgery including in those with mild BXO. The procedure may also be used to prevent the development of phimosis. Phimosis is also a complication that can result from circumcision.

An inflammation of the glans penis and foreskin is called balanoposthitis, and the condition affecting the glans alone is called balanitis. Most cases of these conditions occur in uncircumcised males, affecting 411% of that group. The moist, warm space underneath the foreskin is thought to facilitate the growth of pathogens, particularly when hygiene is poor. Yeasts, especially Candida albicans, are the most common penile infection and are rarely identified in samples taken from circumcised males. Both conditions are usually treated with topical antibiotics (metronidazole cream) and antifungals (clotrimazole cream) or low-potency steroid creams. Circumcision is a treatment option for refractory or recurrent balanoposthitis, but in the twenty-first century the availability of the other treatments has made it less necessary.

Urinary tract infections
A UTI affects parts of the urinary system including the urethra, bladder, and kidneys. There is about a one percent risk of UTIs in boys under two years of age, and the majority of incidents occur in the first year of life. There is good but not ideal evidence that circumcision of babies reduces the incidence of UTIs in boys under two years of age, and there is fair evidence that the reduction in incidence is by a factor of 310 times (100 circumcisions prevents one UTI). Circumcision is most likely to benefit boys who have a high risk of UTIs due to anatomical defects, and may be used to treat recurrent UTIs.

There is a plausible biological explanation for the reduction in UTI risk after circumcision. The orifice through which urine passes at the tip of the penis (the urinary meatus) hosts more urinary system disease-causing bacteria in uncircumcised boys than in circumcised boys, especially in those under six months of age. As these bacteria are a risk factor for UTIs, circumcision may reduce the risk of UTIs through a decrease in the bacterial population.

Cancers
Being uncircumcised is a risk factor for penile cancer.

Penile cancer is a rare disease in the developed world but much more prevalent in the developing world. The penile tissue removed during circumcision is a potential origin for penile cancer. Childhood circumcision has a strong protective effect against penile cancer in later life.

Penile cancer development can be detected in the carcinoma in situ (CIS) cancerous precursor stage and at the more advanced invasive squamous cell carcinoma stage.  There is an association between adult circumcision and an increased risk of invasive penile cancer; this is believed to be from men being circumcised as a treatment for penile cancer or a condition that is a precursor to cancer rather than a consequence of circumcision itself. Penile cancer has been observed to be nearly eliminated in populations of males circumcised neonatally.

Important risk factors for penile cancer include phimosis and HPV infection, both of which are mitigated by circumcision. The mitigating effect circumcision has on the risk factor introduced by the possibility of phimosis is secondary, in that the removal of the foreskin eliminates the possibility of phimosis. This can be inferred from study results that show uncircumcised men with no history of phimosis are equally likely to have penile cancer as circumcised men. Circumcision is also associated with a reduced prevalence of cancer-causing types of HPV in men and a reduced risk of cervical cancer (which is caused by a type of HPV) in female partners of men. 

There is some evidence that circumcision is associated with lower risk of prostate cancer. A 2015 meta-analysis found a reduced risk of prostate cancer associated with circumcision in black men. A 2016 meta-analysis found that men with prostate cancer were less likely to be circumcised.

Women's health 
A 2017 systematic review found consistent evidence that male circumcision prior to heterosexual contact was associated with a decreased risk of cervical cancer, cervical dysplasia, HSV-2, chlamydia, and syphilis among women. The evidence was less consistent in regards to the potential association of circumcision with women's risk of HPV and HIV.

Sexual effects

Circumcision does not affect sexual function, sensation, desire, or pleasure. Although consistently rejected in the academic literature and by major medical organizations, there are various popular misconceptions and cultural myths that circumcision benefits or adversely affects sexual function and libido.  A 2013 systematic review published in the Asian Journal of Andrology found that circumcision did not appear to adversely affect or prevent pain with intercourse, premature ejaculation, time until ejaculation, erectile dysfunction or difficulties with orgasm. However, the study found that the existing evidence is insufficient to make conclusive determinations. The effect of circumcision on sexual partners' experiences is unclear as this has not been well studied.

Adverse effects
Neonatal circumcision is generally a safe, low-risk procedure when done by an experienced practitioner.

The most common acute complications are bleeding, infection and the removal of either too much or too little foreskin. These complications occur in approximately 0.13% of procedures, with bleeding being the most common acute complication in the United States. Minor complications are reported to occur in three percent of procedures. Severe complications are rare. A specific complication rate is difficult to determine due to scant data on complications and inconsistencies in their classification. Complication rates are greater when the procedure is performed by an inexperienced operator, in unsterile conditions, or when the child is at an older age. Significant acute complications happen rarely, occurring in about 1 in 500 newborn procedures in the United States. Severe to catastrophic complications, including death, are so rare that they are reported only as individual case reports. Where a Plastibell device is used, the most common complication is the retention of the device occurring in around 3.5% of procedures. Other possible complications include buried penis, chordee, phimosis, skin bridges, urethral fistulas, and meatal stenosis. These complications may be partly avoided with proper technique, and are often treatable without requiring surgical revision. The most common long-term complication is meatal stenosis, this is almost exclusively seen in circumcised children, it is thought to be caused by ammonia producing bacteria coming into contact with the meatus in circumcised infants. It can be treated by meatotomy.

Effective pain management should be used during the procedure. Inadequate pain relief may carry the risks of heightened pain response for newborns. Newborns that experience pain due to being circumcised have different responses to vaccines given afterwards, with higher pain scores observed. For adult men who have been circumcised, there is a risk that the circumcision scar may be tender.

It is unclear what the psychological outcomes of circumcision are. Studies have shown positive, neutral, or negative effects. There is debate in the literature over whether the pain of circumcision has lasting psychological impact, with only weak underlying data available. There is no good evidence that circumcision affects cognitive abilities.

Prevalence

Circumcision is one of the world's most widely performed medical procedures.

Present 
Approximately 38% of males worldwide are circumcised as of 2016. Around half are performed for reasons of prophylactic healthcare and half for religious or cultural reasons. It is most often practiced between infancy and the early twenties. This is an increase from 2007, when WHO estimated that 664,500,000 males aged 15 and over were circumcised (30–33% global prevalence), and that 70% of circumcised men were Muslim. A study on male circumcision prevalence in 118 developing countries found that 69% of circumcised men were Muslim.

Circumcision is most common in Australia, Canada, Israel, New Zealand, the Muslim world, South Korea, the United States, and parts of Southeast Asia and Africa. It is relatively rare for non-religious reasons in Europe, Latin America, parts of Southern Africa and Oceania and most of non-Muslim Asia. Prevalence is near-universal in the Middle East and Central Asia. Non-religious circumcision in Asia, outside the Republic of Korea and the Philippines, is fairly rare, and prevalence is generally low (less than 20%) across Europe. Estimates for individual countries include Taiwan at 9% and Australia 58.7%. Prevalence in the United States and Canada is estimated at 75% and 30% respectively. Prevalence in Africa varies from less than 20% in some southern African countries to near universal in North and West Africa.

Rates of circumcision over time have varied by country. As of 2021, Wolters Kluwer Health estimates that present circumcision incidence in the United States is 80%, and most are performed in the neonatal period for prophylactic reasons. Circumcision incidence in the U.S. has likely risen since 2012, when the AAP released a policy statement that was more positive on the topic. Hospital discharge surveys in the U.S. show lower numbers, although this is likely due to miscoding, circumcisions performed after hospital discharge, and those performed later in life. Canada has seen a slow decline since the early 1970s, possibly influenced by past statements from the AAP and the Canadian Pediatric Society in the 1970s that stated it was not medically necessary. In Australia, the rate declined in the 1970s and 80s, but has been increasing slowly as of 2004. In the United Kingdom, prevalence was likely to have been 20–30% in the 1940s but declined at the end of that decade. One possible reason may have been a 1949 British Medical Journal article which argued that there was no good medical reason for routine circumcision. The overall prevalence of circumcision in South Korea has increased markedly in the second half of the 20th century, rising from near zero around 1950 to about 60% in 2000, with the most significant jumps in the last two decades of that time period. 

Medical organizations can affect the neonatal circumcision rate of a country by influencing whether the costs of the procedure are borne by the parents or are covered by insurance or a national health care system. Policies that require the costs to be paid by the parents yield lower circumcision rates. The decline in the rates in the UK is one example; another is that in United States, with states where insurance or Medicaid covers the costs having higher rates. Changes to policy are driven by the results of new research, and moderated by the politics, demographics, and culture of the communities.

History

Circumcision is the world's oldest planned surgical procedure, suggested by anatomist and hyperdiffusionist historian Grafton Elliot Smith to be over 15,000 years old, pre-dating recorded history. There is no firm consensus as to how it came to be practiced worldwide. One theory is that it began in one geographic area and spread from there; another is that several different cultural groups began its practice independently. In his 1891 work History of Circumcision, physician Peter Charles Remondino suggested that it began as a less severe form of emasculating a captured enemy: penectomy or castration would likely have been fatal, while some form of circumcision would permanently mark the defeated yet leave him alive to serve as a slave. Other explanations for its origin include it acting as a religious sacrifice or a rite of passage marking a boy's entrance into adulthood.

The history of the migration and evolution of the practice of circumcision is followed mainly through the cultures and peoples in two separate regions. In the lands south and east of the Mediterranean, starting with Sudan and Ethiopia, the procedure was practiced by the ancient Egyptians and the Semites, and then by the Jews and Muslims, with whom the practice travelled to and was adopted by the Bantu Africans. In Oceania, circumcision is practiced by the Australian Aboriginals and Polynesians. There is also evidence that circumcision was practiced among the Aztec and Mayan civilizations in the Americas, but little detail is available about its history.

Middle East, Africa and Europe

At Oued Djerat, in Algeria, engraved rock art with masked bowmen, which feature male circumcision and may be a scene involving ritual, have been dated to earlier than 6000 BP amid the Bubaline Period; more specifically, while possibly dating much earlier than 10,000 BP, rock art walls from the Bubaline Period have been dated between 9200 BP and 5500 BP. The cultural practice of circumcision may have spread from the Central Sahara, toward the south in Sub-Saharan Africa and toward the east in the region of the Nile. Based on engraved evidence found on walls and evidence from mummies, circumcision has been dated to at least as early as 6000 BCE in ancient Egypt. Some ancient Egyptian mummies, which have been dated as early as 4000 BCE, show evidence of having undergone circumcision.

Evidence suggests that circumcision was practiced in the Middle East by the fourth millennium BCE, when the Sumerians and the Semites moved into the area that is modern-day Iraq from the North and West.  The earliest historical record of circumcision comes from Egypt, in the form of an image of the circumcision of an adult carved into the tomb of Ankh-Mahor at Saqqara, dating to about 24002300 BCE. Circumcision was done by the Egyptians possibly for hygienic reasons, but also was part of their obsession with purity and was associated with spiritual and intellectual development.  No well-accepted theory explains the significance of circumcision to the Egyptians, but it appears to have been endowed with great honor and importance as a rite of passage into adulthood, performed in a public ceremony emphasizing the continuation of family generations and fertility.  It may have been a mark of distinction for the elite:  the Egyptian Book of the Dead describes the sun god Ra as having circumcised himself.

Circumcision features prominently in the Hebrew Bible. The narrative in Genesis chapter 17 describes the circumcision of Abraham and his relatives and slaves. In the same chapter, Abraham's descendants are commanded to circumcise their sons on the eighth day of life as part of a covenant with God. In addition to proposing that circumcision was taken up by the Israelites purely as a religious mandate, scholars have suggested that Judaism's patriarchs and their followers adopted circumcision to make penile hygiene easier in hot, sandy climates; as a rite of passage into adulthood; or as a form of blood sacrifice.

Historical campaigns of ethnic, cultural, and religious persecution frequently included bans on the practice as a means of forceful assimilation, conversion, and ethnocide. Alexander the Great conquered the Middle East in the fourth century BCE, and in the following centuries ancient Greek cultures and values came to the Middle East. The Greeks abhorred circumcision, making life for circumcised Jews living among the Greeks and later the Romans very difficult.  Restrictions on the Jewish practice by European governments have occurred several times in world history, including the Seleucid Empire under Antiochus IV and the Roman Empire under Hadrian, where it was used as a means of forceful assimilation and conversion. Antiochus IV's restriction on Jewish circumcision was a major factor in the Maccabean Revolt. Hadrian's prohibition has also been considered by some to have been a contributing cause of the Bar Kokhba revolt. According to Silverman (2006), these restrictions were part of a "broad campaign" by the Romans to "civilize" the Jewish people, viewing the practice as replusive and analogous to castration. His successor, Antoninus Pius, altered the edict to permit . During this period in history, Jewish circumcision called for the removal of only a part of the prepuce, and Hellenized Jews often attempted to look uncircumcised by stretching the extant parts of their foreskins. This was considered by the Jewish leaders to be a serious problem, and during the second century CE they changed the requirements of Jewish circumcision to call for the complete removal of the foreskin, emphasizing the Jewish view of circumcision as intended to be not just the fulfillment of a Biblical commandment but also an essential and permanent mark of membership in a people.

A narrative in the Christian Gospel of Luke makes a brief mention of the circumcision of Jesus, but the subject of physical circumcision itself is not part of the received teachings of Jesus.  Circumcision has played an important role in Christian history and theology. Paul the Apostle reinterpreted circumcision as a spiritual concept, arguing the physical one to be unnecessary for Gentile converts to Christianity. The teaching that physical circumcision was unnecessary for membership in a divine covenant was instrumental in the separation of Christianity from Judaism. While the circumcision of Jesus is celebrated as a feast day in the liturgical calendar of many Christian denominations.

Although it is not explicitly mentioned in the Quran (early seventh century CE), circumcision is considered essential to Islam, and it is nearly universally performed among Muslims.  The practice of circumcision spread across the Middle East, North Africa, and Southern Europe with Islam.

Genghis Khan and the following Yuan Emperors in China forbade Islamic practices such as halal butchering and circumcision.

The practice of circumcision is thought to have been brought to the Bantu-speaking tribes of Africa by either the Jews after one of their many expulsions from European countries, or by Muslim Moors escaping after the 1492 reconquest of Spain. In the second half of the first millennium CE, inhabitants from the North East of Africa moved south and encountered groups from Arabia, the Middle East, and West Africa. These people moved south and formed what is known today as the Bantu. Bantu tribes were observed to be upholding what was described as Jewish law, including circumcision, in the 16th century. Circumcision and elements of Jewish dietary restrictions are still found among Bantu tribes.

Indigenous peoples of the Americas and Oceania
Circumcision is practiced by some groups amongst Australian Aboriginal peoples, Polynesians, and Native Americans. Little information is available about the origins and history of circumcision among these peoples, compared to circumcision in the Middle East.

For Aboriginal Australians and Polynesians, circumcision likely started as a blood sacrifice and a test of bravery and became an initiation rite with attendant instruction in manhood in more recent centuries.  Often seashells were used to remove the foreskin, and the bleeding was stopped with eucalyptus smoke.

Christopher Columbus reported circumcision being practiced by Native Americans. It probably started among South American tribes as a blood sacrifice or ritual to test bravery and endurance, and its use later evolved into a rite of initiation.

Prophylactic circumcision

Anglophonic adoption (1855–1918) 

Circumcision began to be advocated as a means of prophylaxis in 1855, primarily as a means of preventing the transmission of sexually transmitted infections. At this time, British physician Jonathan Hutchinson published his findings that, among his venereal disease patients, Jews had a lower prevalence of syphilis. Hutchinson suggested that circumcision lowers the risk of contracting syphilis. Pursuing a successful career as a general practitioner, Hutchinson went on to advocate circumcision for health reasons for the next fifty years, eventually earned a knighthood for his overall contributions to medicine. His viewpoint that circumcision was prophylactic against disease was adopted by other medical professionals of the time. 

In 1870, the influential orthopedic surgeon Lewis Sayre, a founder of the American Medical Association, introduced circumcision in the United States as a purported cure for several cases of young boys presenting with paralysis and other significant gross motor problems. He thought the procedure ameliorated such problems based on the then prominent "reflex neurosis" theory of disease, with the understanding that a tight foreskin inflamed the nerves and caused systemic problems. The use of circumcision to promote good health also fit in with the germ theory of disease, which saw validation during the same time period:  the foreskin was seen as harboring infection-causing smegma. Sayre published works on the subject and promoted it energetically in speeches. Although later discredited, many contemporary physicians believed it could cure, reduce, or otherwise prevent a wide-ranging array of perceived medical problems and social ills, including that of epilepsy, hernia, headache, masturbation, clubfoot, alcoholism and gout. Its popularity spread with publications such as Peter Charles Remondino's History of Circumcision. By the late 19th century, circumcision had become a common medical procedure throughout a majority of the core Anglophonic world—Australia, Canada, the United States, and the United Kingdom—as well as the Union of South Africa. In the United Kingdom and United States, it was universally recommended.

Historian David Gollaher proposes that "Americans found circumcision appealing not merely on medical grounds, but also for its connotations of science, health, and cleanliness—newly important class distinctions" in a country where 17 million immigrants arrived between 1890 and 1914.

Interwar Period and World War II (1918-1945) 

During the interwar period, medical organizations and doctors in mainland Europe experimented with the idea of introducing routine circumcision for prophylactic reasons as well, in lieu of the-then ongoing developments in the Anglophonic world. In France, the medical profession went so far as to recommended universal routine circumcision. However, prevalence in France and mainland Europe remained low. There is a lack of consensus in the academic literature on why this occurred. 

Yosha & Bolnick & Koyle (2012) have suggested that a factor in its Anglophonic adoption and dismissal in mainland Europe relate to attitudes towards Judaism and Jewish practices. While many of these Anglophonic polities would not considered tolerant by modern standards: the United Kingdom had Benjamin Disraeli—a Jew—as Prime Minister; Jews in the United States were a prominent and generally well-respected part of American life; while in Australia "the racial issues of the time involved primarily Aborigines and Chinese immigration, and Jews were essentially below the radar." They argue that once "a substantial proportion of the male population [was] circumcised, the idea that it [was] a Jewish practice [became] no longer relevant. In Britain this was aided by the fact that circumcision was well known to be as much a practice of the nobility as a Jewish religious rite, so that the racial-religious nexus was broken." These factors were absent in continental Europe.

Rates in the Anglophonic world began to sharply diverge after 1945.

Mid-20th century (1945–1985) 
After the end of World War II, Britain implemented a National Health Service. Douglas Gairdner's 1949 article "The Fate of the Foreskin" argued that the evidence available at that time showed that the risks outweighed the known benefits, leading to a significant reduction in circumcision incidence within the United Kingdom. 

In contrast to Gairdner, the influential American pediatrician Benjamin Spock argued in favor of circumcision in his work The Common Sense Book of Baby and Child Care. This led to rates in the United States significantly rising. In the 1970s, national medical associations in Australia and Canada issued recommendations against routine infant circumcision, leading to drops in the rates of both of those countries. The United States made similar statements in the 1970s, but stopped short of recommending against it.

Modernity (1985–present) 

An association between circumcision and reduced heterosexual HIV infection rates was first suggested in 1986.

Experimental evidence was needed to establish a causal relationship, so three randomized controlled trials were commissioned as a means to reduce the effect of any confounding factors. Trials took place in South Africa, Kenya and Uganda. All three trials were stopped early by their monitoring boards because those in the circumcised group had a substantially lower rate of HIV contraction than the control group, and hence it was seen as unethical to withhold the procedure, in light of strong evidence of prophylactic efficacy. WHO assessed these as "gold standard" studies and found "strong and consistent" evidence from later studies that confirmed the results of the studies. A scientific consensus subsequently developed that circumcision reduces heterosexual HIV infection rates in high-risk populations; the WHO, along with other major medical organizations, have since promoted the widespread adoption of circumcision in high-risk populations as part of an overall program to reduce the spread of HIV. The Male Circumcision Clearinghouse website was formed in 2009 by WHO, UNAIDS, FHI and AVAC to provide current evidence-based guidance, information, and resources to support the delivery of safe male circumcision services in countries that choose to scale up the procedure as one component of comprehensive HIV prevention services.

Society and culture

The word circumcision is from Latin , meaning "to cut around".

Cultures and religions 

Many societies hold cultural, ethical, or social views on the practice, with perspectives ranging widely. In some cultures, males are generally required to be circumcised shortly after birth, during childhood or around puberty as part of a rite of passage. Circumcision is commonly practiced in the Jewish and Islamic and Druze faiths and in Coptic Christianity and the Ethiopian Orthodox Church and the Eritrean Orthodox Tewahedo Church. In contrast, some religions, such as Mandaeism and Hinduism and Sikhism, strongly prohibit the practice of routine circumcision.

Judaism
Circumcision is near-universal among Jews. The mitzvah of circumcision on the eighth day of life is considered among the most important commandments in Judaism. Barring extraordinary circumstances, failure to undergo the rite is seen by followers of Judaism as leading to a state of Kareth: the extinction of the soul and denial of a share in the world to come.

The basis for its observance is found in the Torah of the Hebrew Bible, in Genesis chapter 17, in which a covenant of circumcision is made with Abraham and his descendants. Jewish law requires that the circumcision leaves the glans bare when the penis is flaccid. Converts to Conservative and Orthodox Judaism must also be circumcised; those who are already circumcised undergo a symbolic circumcision ritual. Circumcision is not required by Judaism for one to be considered Jewish, but mainstream Judaism foresees serious negative spiritual consequences if it is neglected. Circumcision is not considered a universal moral law within Judaism. Rather, the commandment to circumcise is seen as only applying to Jewish people. Those who are Gentiles are believed to have a portion in the "World to Come" as long as they follow the tenets of the Seven Laws of Noah. There are also certain exceptions for Jews with poor health.

According to traditional Jewish law, in the absence of an adult free Jewish male expert, a woman, a slave, or a child who has the required skills is also authorized to perform the circumcision, provided that they are Jewish. In 1984 Deborah Cohen became the first certified Reform ; she was certified by the Berit Mila program of Reform Judaism. A small minority of Jews in the United States have chosen not to circumcise their sons.

All major rabbinical organizations make the recommendation that male infants should be circumcised. The issue of converts remains controversial in Reform and Reconstructionist Judaism; circumcision of converts is not mandatory in either.

Islam

Despite its common practice in Muslim-majority nations, circumcision is considered to be sunnah (tradition) and not required for a life directed by Allah. According to historians of religion and scholars of Religious studies, the Islamic tradition of circumcision was derived from the Pagan practices and rituals of pre-Islamic Arabia. Although there is some debate within Islam over whether it is a religious requirement or mere recommendation, circumcision (called khitan) is practiced nearly universally by Muslim males. Islam bases its practice of circumcision on the Genesis 17 narrative, the same Biblical chapter referred to by Jews. The procedure is not explicitly mentioned in the Quran, however, it is a tradition established by Islam's prophet Muhammad directly (following Abraham), and so its practice is considered a sunnah (prophet's tradition) and is very important in Islam. For Muslims, circumcision is also a matter of cleanliness, purification and control over one's baser self (nafs).

There is no agreement across the many Islamic communities about the age at which circumcision should be performed. It may be done from soon after birth up to about age 15; most often it is performed at around six to seven years of age. The timing can correspond with the boy's completion of his recitation of the whole Quran, with a coming-of-age event such as taking on the responsibility of daily prayer or betrothal. Circumcision may be celebrated with an associated family or community event. Circumcision is recommended for, but is not required of, converts to Islam.

Christianity

Traditionally, circumcision has not been practiced by Christians for religious reasons, with the practice being viewed as succeeded by Baptism, with the New Testament chapter Acts 15 recording that Christianity did not require circumcision from new converts. Christian denominations generally hold a neutral position on circumcision for prophylactic, cultural, and social reasons, while strongly opposing it for religious reasons. This includes the Catholic Church, which explicitly banned the practice of religious circumcision in the Council of Florence, and maintains a neutral position on the practice of circumcision for other reasons. A majority of other Christian denominations take a similar position on circumcision, prohibiting it for religious observance, but neither explicitly supporting or forbidding it for other reasons. 
 
Thus, circumcision rates of Christians are predominately determined by the surrounding cultures in which they live in. In some African and Eastern Christian denominations circumcision is an established practice, and generally men undergo circumcision shortly after birth as part of a rite of passage. Circumcision is near-universal among Coptic Christians, and they practice circumcision as a rite of passage. The Ethiopian Orthodox Church calls for circumcision, with near-universal prevalence among Orthodox men in Ethiopia. Eritrean Orthodox practice circumcision as a rite of passage, and they circumcise their sons "anywhere from the first week of life to the first few year". Some Christian churches in South Africa disapprove of the practice, while others require it of their members.

Circumcision is practiced in some predominantly Christian countries and Christian communities. Christian communities in Africa, the Anglosphere countries, the Philippines, the Middle East, South Korea and Oceania have high circumcision rates, while Christian communities in Europe and South America have low circumcision rates, although none of these are performed out of perceived religious obligation. Scholar Heather L. Armstrong writes that, as of 2021, about half of Christian males worldwide are circumcised, with most of them being located in Africa, Anglosphere countries, and the Philippines.

Druze faith

Circumcision is widely practiced by the Druze; Druze practice Druzism, an Abrahamic, monotheistic, syncretic, and ethnic religion. The procedure is practiced as a cultural tradition, and has no religious significance in the Druze faith. There is no special date for this act in the Druze faith: male Druze infants are usually circumcised shortly after birth, however some remain uncircumcised until the age of ten or older.

Some Druses do not circumcise their male children, and refuse to observe this "common Muslim practice".

Samaritanism

Like Judaism, the religion of Samaritanism requires ritual circumcision on the eighth day of life.

Mandaeism
Circumcision is forbidden in Mandaeism, and the sign of the Jews given to Abraham by God, circumcision, is considered abhorrent by the Mandaeans. According to the Mandaean doctrine a circumcised man cannot serve as a Mandaean priest.

Yazidism
Circumcision is not required in Yazidism, but is practised by some Yazidis due to regional customs. The ritual is usually performed soon after birth, it takes place on the knees of the kerîf (approximately "godfather"), with whom the child will have a life-long formal relationship.

Sikhism
Sikhism does not require the elective circumcision of its followers and strongly criticizes the practice.

For example, Bhagat Kabir criticizes the practise of circumcision in the following hymn of Guru Granth Sahib:

African cultures

Circumcision is prevalent among 92% of men in North Africa and around 62% in Sub-Saharan Africa.  In western and northern parts of Africa it is mainly performed for religious reasons, whereas in southern parts of Africa it rarely performed in neonates, instead being a rite of passage into manhood. Certain African cultural groups, such as the Yoruba and the Igbo of Nigeria, customarily circumcise their infant sons. The procedure is also practiced by some cultural groups or individual family lines in Sudan, Democratic Republic of the Congo, Uganda and in southern Africa. For some of these groups, circumcision appears to be purely cultural, done with no particular religious significance or intention to distinguish members of a group. For others, circumcision might be done for purification, or it may be interpreted as a mark of subjugation. Among these groups, even when circumcision is done for reasons of tradition, it is often done in hospitals.

The Maasai people, who live predominantly in Kenya and Tanzania, use circumcision as a rite of passage. It is also used for distinguished age groups. This is usually done after every fifteen years where a new "age set" are formed. The new members are to undergo initiation at the same time. Whenever new age groups are initiated, they will become novice warriors and replace the previous group. The new initiates will be given a unique name that will be an important marker of the history of the Maasai. No anesthesia is used, and initiates have to endure the pain or be called flinchers.

The Xhosa community practice circumcision as a sacrifice. In doing so, young boys will announce to their family members when they are ready for circumcision by singing. The sacrifice is the blood spilt during the initiation procedure. Young boys will be considered an "outsiders" unless they undergo circumcision. It is not clear how many deaths and injuries result from non-clinical circumcisions.

Australian cultures
Some Australian Aborigines use circumcision as a test of bravery and self-control as a part of a rite of passage into manhood, which results in full societal and ceremonial membership.  It may be accompanied by body scarification and the removal of teeth, and may be followed later by penile subincision.  Circumcision is one of many trials and ceremonies required before a youth is considered to have become knowledgeable enough to maintain and pass on the cultural traditions.  During these trials, the maturing youth bonds in solidarity with the men.  Circumcision is also strongly associated with a man's family, and it is part of the process required to prepare a man to take a wife and produce his own family.

Filipino culture

In the Philippines, circumcision is known as "tuli" and is generally viewed as a rite of passage. An overwhelming majority of Filipino men are circumcised. Often this occurs, in April and May, when Filipino boys are taken by their parents. The practice dates back to the arrival of Islam in 1450. Pressure to be circumcised is even in the language: one Tagalog word for 'uncircumcised' is supot, meaning 'coward' literally. A circumcised eight or ten year-old is no longer considered a boy and is given more adult roles in the family and society.

Ethical and legal issues

Ethics 
There is a long-running and vigorous debate over ethical concerns regarding circumcision, particularly neonatal circumcision for reasons other than intended direct medical benefit. There are three parties involved in the decision to circumcise a minor: the minor as the patient, the parents (or other guardians) and the physician.  The physician is bound under the ethical principles of beneficence (promoting well-being) and non-maleficence ("first, do no harm"), and so is charged with the responsibility to promote the best interests of the patient while minimizing unnecessary harms. Those involved must weigh the factors of what is in the best interest of the minor against the potential harms of the procedure. 

With a newborn involved, the decision is made more complex due to the principles of respect for autonomy and consent, as a newborn cannot understand or engage in a logical discussion of his own values and best interests.  A mentally more mature child can understand the issues involved to some degree, and the physician and parents may elicit input from the child and weigh it appropriately in the decision-making process, although the law may not treat such input as legally informative. Ethicists and legal theorists also state that it is questionable for parents to make a decision for the child that precludes the child from making a different decision for himself later. Such a question can be raised for the decision by the parents either to circumcise or not to circumcise the child.

Parents are assumed to have the child's best interests in mind. Ethically, it is imperative that the medical practitioner inform the parents about the benefits and risks of the procedure and obtain informed consent before performing it. Practically, however, many parents come to a decision about circumcising the child before he is born, and a discussion of the benefits and risks of the procedure with a physician has not been shown to have a significant effect on the decision. Some parents request to have their newborn or older child circumcised for non-therapeutic reasons, such as the parents' desires to adhere to family tradition, cultural norms or religious beliefs. In considering such a request, the physician may consider (in addition to any potential medical benefits and harms) such non-medical factors in determining the child's best interests and may ethically perform the procedure. Equally, without a clear medical benefit relative to the potential harms, a physician may take the ethical position that non-medical factors do not contribute enough as benefits to outweigh the potential harms and refuse to perform the procedure. Medical organizations such as the British Medical Association state that their member physicians are not obliged to perform the procedure in such situations.

The German Academy for Pediatric and Adolescent Medicine (Deutsche Akademie für Kinder- und Jugendmedizin e.V., DAKJ) recommend against routine non-medical infant circumcision. The Royal Dutch Medical Association questions why the ethics regarding male genital alterations should be viewed any differently from female genital alterations.  

The procedure's relationship to other prophylactic procedures, along with the concepts of group rights, consent, and religious freedom, have been discussed in academic literature.  Opponents have argued that ethical or legal opposition to circumcision is a form of ethnocentrism intended to privilege the rights of Christians over religious minorities, particularly Jews and Muslims.

Legal 
Generally, circumcision on a minor is not ethically controversial or legally questionable when there is a clear and pressing medical indication for which it is the accepted best practice to resolve. Where circumcision is the chosen intervention, the physician has an ethical responsibility to ensure the procedure is performed competently and safely to minimize potential harms. Worldwide, most legal jurisdictions do not have specific laws concerning the circumcision of males, but infant circumcision is not illegal in many countries. A few countries have passed legislation on the procedure: Germany allows routine circumcision, while non-religious routine circumcision is illegal in South Africa and Sweden. The religious circumcision of minors is legal in every polity.

No major medical organization recommends circumcising all males, and no major medical organization recommends banning the procedure. In the academic literature, there is general agreement among both supporters and opponents of the practice that an outright ban would be predominately ineffective. A consensus to keep the procedure within the purview of medical professionals is found across all major medical organizations, who advise medical professionals to yield to some degree to parental preferences in their decision to agree to circumcise. The Royal Dutch Medical Association, which expresses some of the strongest opposition to routine neonatal circumcision, argues that while there are valid reasons for banning it, doing so could lead parents who insist on the procedure to turn to poorly trained practitioners instead of medical professionals.

Economic considerations
The cost-effectiveness of circumcision has been studied to determine whether a policy of circumcising all newborns or a policy of promoting and providing inexpensive or free access to circumcision for all adult men who choose it would result in lower overall societal healthcare costs. As HIV/AIDS is an incurable disease that is expensive to manage, significant effort has been spent studying the cost-effectiveness of circumcision to reduce its spread in parts of Africa that have a relatively high infection rate and low circumcision prevalence. Several analyses have concluded that circumcision programs for adult men in Africa are cost-effective and in some cases are cost-saving. In Rwanda, circumcision has been found to be cost-effective across a wide range of age groups from newborn to adult, with the greatest savings achieved when the procedure is performed in the newborn period due to the lower cost per procedure and greater timeframe for HIV infection protection. Circumcision for the prevention of HIV transmission in adults has also been found to be cost-effective in South Africa, Kenya, and Uganda, with cost savings estimated in the billions of US dollars over 20 years. Hankins et al. (2011) estimated that a $1.5 billion investment in circumcision for adults in 13 high-priority African countries would yield $16.5 billion in savings.

The overall cost-effectiveness of neonatal circumcision has also been studied in the United States, which has a different cost setting from Africa in areas such as public health infrastructure, availability of medications, and medical technology and the willingness to use it. A study by the CDC suggests that newborn circumcision would be societally cost-effective in the United States based on circumcision's efficacy against the transmission of HIV alone during coitus, without considering any other cost benefits. The American Academy of Pediatrics (2012) recommends that neonatal circumcision in the United States be covered by third-party payers such as Medicaid and insurance. A 2014 review that considered reported benefits of circumcision such as reduced risks from HIV, HPV, and HSV-2 stated that circumcision is cost-effective in both the United States and Africa and may result in health care savings. A 2014 literature review found that there are significant gaps in the current literature on male and female sexual health that need to be addressed for the literature to be applicable to North American populations.

References

Notes

General and cited references

External links 

 Videos of infant circumcision: using a Plastibell, a Gomco clamp and a Mogen clamp (all from Stanford Medical School)
 A Xhosa circumcision from National Geographic

 
Cosmetic surgery
Pediatric surgery
Prevention of HIV/AIDS
Religion and children
Wikipedia medicine articles ready to translate (full)